Ming-Bulak is a settlement in the Naryn Region of Kyrgyzstan. It is part of the Naryn District. Its population was 1,438 in 2021.

Population

References

Populated places in Naryn Region